Arachidonylcyclopropylamide (ACPA) is a synthetic agonist of the cannabinoid receptor 1 (CB1R). ACPA is considered to be a selective cannabinoid agonist as it binds primarily to the CB1R and has low affinity to the cannabinoid receptor 2 (CB2R) (Ki = 2.2 nM for CB1R; Ki = 700 nM for CB2R).

References

Fatty acid amides
Cannabinoids
Cyclopropanes
Arachidonyl compounds